Terry Sackor (born 1 April 1993) is a Liberian football striker for LPRC Oilers.

References

1993 births
Living people
Liberian footballers
Liberia international footballers
LPRC Oilers players
Association football forwards
Place of birth missing (living people)